"Country Ain't Country" is a song recorded by American country music artist Travis Tritt.  It was released in January 2003 as the second single from the album Strong Enough.  The song reached #26 on the Billboard Hot Country Singles & Tracks chart.  The song was written by Teresa Boaz, Casey Beathard and Carson Chamberlain.

Chart performance

References

2003 singles
2002 songs
Travis Tritt songs
Songs written by Casey Beathard
Songs written by Carson Chamberlain
Song recordings produced by Billy Joe Walker Jr.
Columbia Nashville Records singles